

34th Legislature of the U.S. Virgin Islands  (2021)

Senator at-large (Saint John) 
Senator Angel L Bolques Jr. (Democrat)

Saint Croix senators 
Senator Novelle Francis Vice President-Secretary for Intergovernmental and Territorial Affairs (Democrat)
Senator Kurt Vialet (Democrat)
Senator Javan James Sr. (Independent)
Senator Franklin Johnson (Independent)
Senator Genevieve Whitaker (Democrat)
Senator Samuel  Carrión (Independent)
Senator Kenneth L Gittens (Democrat) Liaison to the White House

Saint Thomas-Saint John senators 
Senator Donna Frett-Gregory-Senate President (Democrat)
Senator Marvin A. Blyden-Liaison to the U.S Congress (Democrat)
Senator Dwayne m. De Graff (Independent)
Alma Francis-Heyliger (Independent)
Senator Carla J Joseph (Democrat)
Senator Janelle K Sarauw (Independent)
Senator Kurt Vialet (Independent)

Officers of the 34 Legislature 
President: Senator Donna Frett-Gregory

Vice President: Senator Novelle Francis

Majority Leader: Senator Marvin Blyden

Secretary of Intern Governmental and Territorial Affairs: Senator Novelle Francis

Liaison to US Congress: Senator Marvin Blyden

Liaison to US Department of Interior Office of Insular Affairs: Senator Genevieve Whitaker

Liaison to the White House: Senator Kenneth Gittens

References

Government of the United States Virgin Islands
Main|Senators